Area code 906 is the telephone area code in the North American Numbering Plan (NANP) for the Upper Peninsula of Michigan.

History
Area code 906 was assigned in an area code split of numbering plan area (NPA) 616 on March 19, 1961, in a flash cut, which means no permissive dialing period was implemented. 906 is among the least populous numbering plan areas in North America, serving only about 320,000 people. Therefore, it is unlikely 906 will exhaust in the foreseeable future. The area code has inspired an unofficial holiday in the Upper Peninsula on September 6 (906 correlating to the month/day date).

Prior to October 2021, area code 906 had telephone numbers assigned for the central office code 988. In 2020, 988 was designated nationwide as a dialing code for the National Suicide Prevention Lifeline, which created a conflict for exchanges that permit seven-digit dialing. This area code was therefore scheduled to transition to ten-digit dialing by October 24, 2021.

Service area
Area code 906 is used in the following cities:
 Baraga
 Calumet
 Escanaba
 Gladstone
 Hancock
 Houghton
 Iron Mountain
 Ironwood
 Ishpeming
 Kingsford
 L'Anse
 Marquette
 Manistique
 Menominee
 Newberry
 Norway
 St. Ignace
 Sault Ste. Marie

Isle Royale National Park and Mackinac Island also use the 906 area code.

Bois Blanc Township in the only municipality associated with the Upper Peninsula to not use area code 906. It is an island in Lake Huron whose only ferry service is with the closer Lower Peninsula, and therefore uses area code 231.

Most of the numbering plan area is in the Eastern Time Zone, except for the counties bordering Wisconsin, which are in the Central Time Zone.

See also
List of NANP area codes

References

External links
Map of Michigan area codes at North American Numbering Plan Administration's website
 List of exchanges from AreaCodeDownload.com, 906 Area Code

906
906
Upper Peninsula of Michigan